Li Youwen (1901–1984) was a People's Republic of China politician. He was born in Liaoyang County, Liaoning Province. He served as Governor of Jilin Province. He was a delegate to the 5th National People's Congress (1978–1983). He was the 1st People's Congress Chairman of Jilin.

1901 births
1984 deaths
People's Republic of China politicians from Liaoning
Chinese Communist Party politicians from Liaoning
Governors of Jilin
Politicians from Liaoyang
Delegates to the 5th National People's Congress
National University of Peking alumni